The City to Sea Bridge is a pedestrian bridge and public artwork located in Wellington City, New Zealand. Opened on 31 October 1993, the wedge-shaped bridge crosses arterial road Jervois Quay, connecting the public spaces of Civic Square to the Wellington waterfront precinct at Whairepo Lagoon. Around the square are the Michael Fowler Centre, Wellington Town Hall, Wellington City Art Gallery and Wellington Central Library.

Architects Rewi Thompson and John Gray were commissioned by Wellington City Council to design the bridge, and they brought in artist Paratene Matchitt to contribute to the design. The Council's brief was that the bridge should address the significance of the waterfront and public space. The bridge is adorned with non-traditional wooden sculptures carved by Matchitt, some of which form the sides of the bridge. On one side are two large birds representing welcome and festivity. On the other are two whales which can also be seen as the taniwha Ngake and Whātaitai, who according to Māori legend created Wellington Harbour. Poles on the bridge have metal shapes on them. Some represent the moon and stars, signifying celestial navigation. Other symbols on the poles are inspired by those on Te Kooti's flag Te Wepu. Matchitt's work was influenced by Te Kooti's philosophies and he used these symbols in other sculptures as well as the bridge. The whole layered bridge structure represents the uplifted and eroded landforms of Wellington and a point of arrival and change. At the Civic Square base of the bridge are two Oamaru stone sculptures by Matt Pine, titled Prow and Capital. A plaque here states:Capital and Prow

The sculptures by Matt Pine on either side of the stairs are part of a series of 10 works called Reflections on an Ancient Past. Capital (above) is based on European classical architectural elements with koru form on the edges. Prow (on the other side) depicts a Maori canoe prow with Taniko weave motif on the edges - a mix of European and Maori cultural elements.Public reaction to the bridge was mixed when it was built, but it has become a tourist attraction in its own right.
Problems with the bridge's design and construction have been ongoing. Remedial work was undertaken shortly after the bridge opened when it was found that small children could fall through gaps. Rot was discovered in 2009 and strengthening undertaken in 2010 and 2011, and then a 2019 report considered its resistance to earthquakes.

Between 15 October 2011 and 31 January 2012 protesters set up a camp on the raised grassed area on the Civic Square side of the bridge. The protest, 'Occupy Wellington', began in support of the international Occupy movement but during the occupation the focus changed to an emphasis on homelessness. The protest cost ratepayers more than $65000 in legal fees, security and repairing damage to the lawn.

References

Buildings and structures in Wellington City
Concrete bridges in New Zealand
1990s architecture in New Zealand
Bridges in the Wellington Region
Footbridges
Wellington Central, Wellington